Rocksteady Studios Limited is a British video game developer based in London, England. The company is a subsidiary of Warner Bros. Games and the studio is best known for its work in the Batman: Arkham series.

History

2004: founding 
Rocksteady Studios was founded on 13 December 2004, by Sefton Hill and Jamie Walker, formerly employed by the previously closed Argonaut Games as creative director and head of production, respectively. Several other Argonaut employees were also hired. SCi Entertainment (later renamed Eidos) was a founding investor in the studio.

2005–2006: Urban Chaos: Riot Response 
Rocksteady's first release was the 2006 first-person shooter Urban Chaos: Riot Response, developed using the Havok engine and published by Eidos Interactive for PlayStation 2 and Xbox. The player controls Nick Mason, a member of the newly formed "T-Zero" riot control squad, in an unnamed, modern city that has been overtaken by the brutal Burners gang.  The game received "average" reviews on both platforms according to the review aggregation website Metacritic.

2007–2009: Batman: Arkham Asylum 
After Eidos obtained the rights to make a Batman game in spring 2007, they approached Rocksteady who presented their take on the Batman license. By May 2007, Rocksteady had started developing the concept of Batman: Arkham Asylum, with full production beginning in September 2007.

Batman: Arkham Asylum was released worldwide for the PlayStation 3 and Xbox 360 video game consoles in August 2009, followed by a Windows PC version a month later. The game received critical acclaim, particularly for its narrative and combat. Reviewers called it the "greatest comic book game of all time," and the "best superhero game of modern times." It won several awards, including Best Action Adventure game, Best Game, and Game of the Year from various media outlets.

2009–2011: Batman: Arkham City 
Batman: Arkham City, an action-adventure game and direct sequel to Batman: Arkham Asylum, was released for the Xbox 360 and PlayStation 3 on 18 October 2011 and for PC on 22 November 2011. The game was later released on the Wii U on 18 November 2012. The game also received a mobile game spin-off, Batman: Arkham City Lockdown, developed by NetherRealm Studios and released in December 2011 on iOS and June 2013 on Android. 

Rocksteady developed ideas for the sequel's story and setting so that the games' narratives could be effectively connected. A secret room containing hints, blueprints, and concept art for the next game was hidden in the asylum warden's office in Arkham Asylum. The room remained hidden for six months following the game's release until Rocksteady revealed its presence.

2011–2015: Batman: Arkham Knight 
Batman: Arkham Knight was released for the PlayStation 4, Xbox One and Windows on 23 June 2015. The game was the third of Rocksteady's Arkham series and introduced new gameplay elements to the series including a drivable version of the Batmobile.  The game received “generally favorable” reviews from critics for the PlayStation 4 and Xbox One versions  and “mixed or average” reviews from critics for the PC version.

2016: Batman: Arkham VR 
Batman: Arkham VR is a virtual reality adventure video game and the first instalment in the series to use virtual reality headsets. Batman: Arkham VR was released worldwide on 11 October 2016 for PlayStation VR, and on 25 April 2017 for PC VR headsets HTC Vive and Oculus Rift. The game's storyline takes place between 2011's Batman: Arkham City and 2015's Batman: Arkham Knight.

In contrast with previous games in the Arkham series, Batman: Arkham VR is presented from a first-person perspective, with a primary focus on using Batman's skills and gadgets to explore the environment and solve puzzles.

2016–present: Suicide Squad: Kill the Justice League 
Suicide Squad: Kill the Justice League is the fifth installment in the Arkham series and is set to release in early 2023 for Windows, PlayStation 5, and Xbox Series X/S. Rocksteady first confirmed the game was in development on 7 August 2020 with the reveal of official artwork for the game. The game is the first in the series to not feature Batman as the main protagonist and will feature four playable characters: Harley Quinn, Deadshot, Captain Boomerang, and King Shark. It is to be the last featuring Kevin Conroy as the voice of Batman.

On 26 October 2022 the founders, Sefton Hill and Jamie Walker, announced that they are leaving the studio at the end of 2022.

Allegations of misconduct 
The Guardian reported in August 2020 that the studio had failed to address issues related to sexual harassment and inappropriate behaviour that more than half of the female employees had written to the studios executives about in a November 2018 letter. Such actions had included "slurs regarding the transgendered community", "discussing a woman in a derogatory or sexual manner with other colleagues", and sexual harassment "in the form of unwanted advances, leering at parts of a woman's body, and inappropriate comments in the office". Rocksteady said to The Guardian, "In 2018 we received a letter from some of our female employees expressing concerns they had at that time, and we immediately took firm measures to address the matters that were raised. Over the subsequent two years we have carefully listened to and learned from our employees, working to ensure every person on the team feels supported. In 2020 we are more passionate than ever to continue to develop our inclusive culture, and we are determined to stand up for all of our staff."

The following day, a letter signed by all current female employees from the company was released to say that they did not agree with the Guardian article and that they hadn't been consulted nor did they agree with the allegations spoken on their behalf.

Games developed

Awards 

Rocksteady Studios was named Studio of the Year at the 2009 Spike Video Game Awards and Developer of the Year at Official Xbox Magazine's 2009 Game of the Year Awards. Rocksteady Studios also won the British Academy Games Awards’ “Best Game in 2010” award for Batman: Arkham Asylum and the SXSW “Excellence in Convergence” award in 2016 for Batman: Arkham Knight.

References

External links 
 

2004 establishments in England
2010 mergers and acquisitions
British companies established in 2004
British subsidiaries of foreign companies
Companies based in the London Borough of Camden
Spike Video Game Award winners
Video game companies established in 2004
Video game companies of the United Kingdom
Video game development companies
Warner Bros. Games